HMS Russell was a 74-gun third-rate ship of the line of the Royal Navy, launched on 22 May 1822 at Deptford.

She was fitted with screw propulsion in 1855, and was broken up in 1865.

Notes

References

 Lavery, Brian (2003) The Ship of the Line - Volume 1: The development of the battlefleet 1650-1850. Conway Maritime Press. .

External links
 

Ships of the line of the Royal Navy
Vengeur-class ships of the line
Ships built in Deptford
1822 ships